Balmer Yard is a rail yard located in the Interbay neighborhood of Seattle, Washington. The yard is owned by BNSF Railway, and was built by predecessor Great Northern Railway as Interbay Yard. As part of a modernization in the late 1960s, which included a 16-track hump, it was renamed after former GN vice president Thomas Balmer. The nearby engine servicing area is still known as Interbay.

See also
 List of rail yards

References

BNSF Railway
Rail infrastructure in Washington (state)
Rail yards in the United States
Transportation in Seattle
Great Northern Railway